Limbaži Municipality is a municipality in Vidzeme, Latvia. The municipality was formed in 2009 by merging Katvari Parish, Limbaži Parish, Pāle Parish, Skulte Parish, Umurga Parish, Vidriži Parish, Viļķene Parish and Limbaži town, the administrative centre being Limbaži. On 1 July 2021, Limbaži Municipality was enlarged when Aloja Municipality and Salacgrīva Municipality were merged into it. Since that date, Limbaži Municipality consists of the following administrative units: Ainaži Parish, Ainaži town, Aloja Parish, Aloja town, Braslava Parish, Brīvzemnieki Parish, Katvari Parish, Liepupe Parish, Limbaži Parish, Limbaži town, Pāle Parish, Salacgrīva Parish, Salacgrīva town, Skulte Parish, Staicele Parish, Staicele town, Umurga Parish, Vidriži Parish and Viļķene Parish. Latvian law defines the entire territory of Limbaži Municipality as a part of the region of Vidzeme.

Population
More than 17,000 inhabitants live in Limbaži municipality.

Colors of Limbaži district symbol

Green color. This is the beautiful nature of the county. Big oaks, larch alleys, dendrological plantations, a unique series of Jumpravmuiža lakes, in which 6 lakes are lined up one after the other. Almost the entire territory of the county belongs to the North Vidzeme Biosphere Reserve. The proximity of the sea, rivers and many lakes provide rich recreational opportunities. Fishing, boat or pedal boat trips, leisurely walks and nature trails. Everyone can enjoy the benefits grown and prepared on organic farms.

Purple color - confirms the stability, nobility and uniqueness of the region. It is recognizable at the national and global level. Unique witnesses of the history of the region have been cleaned up and restored - Limbaži historical center, castles, manors, churches. Limbaži region is the birthplace of the author of the Latvian anthem Baumaņi Kārlis.

Brown-red color - it is sustainable, taking over and nurturing ancient traditions, bringing ancient wisdom to life in today's successful development plans. The people of Limbaži region go out into the world with the works of skilled craftsmen, the natural taste of agricultural products.

Twin towns — sister cities

Limbaži is twinned with:

 Anklam, Germany
 Klippan, Sweden
 Luninets, Belarus
 Panevėžys Municipality, Lithuania
 Pärnu, Estonia
 Radøy, Norway
 Sande, Norway
 Viljandi, Estonia
 Volkhov, Russia

Images

See also
Administrative divisions of Latvia

References

 
Municipalities of Latvia
Vidzeme